Procambarus lucifugus alachua, known as the Alachua light-fleeing cave crayfish, is one of two subspecies of the vampire crayfish (Procambarus lucifugus), along with Procambarus lucifugus lucifugus. It is distinct from P. l. lucifugus due its eyespots.

Distribution
Procambarus lucifugus alachua is found in subterranean waters of 2-3 dozen caves, 11 of are in Alachua or Gilchrist Counties. It is also known to occur in caves in Marion County, Florida, where it interbreeds to form intergrades with P. l. lucifugus.

References

Subspecies
Cambaridae
Cave crayfish
Crustaceans described in 1940
Taxa named by Horton H. Hobbs Jr.
Endemic fauna of Florida
Freshwater crustaceans of North America